Nityananda Mahapatra (17 June 1912 – 17 April 2012) was an Indian Odia politician, poet and journalist.

Political career
He was imprisoned three times by the British Raj between 1930 and 1942 for nationalist activities. He came to literary prominence as editor of the Odia magazine Dagara, and as a short story writer after independence. In his political career Mohapatra served as a member of the Odisha Legislative Assembly from 1957 to 1971 and as state Minister of Supply and Cultural Affairs from 1967 to 1971.

Death
He died on 17 April 2012 at around 9:45am at Kharavelanagar, Bhubaneswar, Odisha, from complications of respiratory failure. He had been in a coma at the Aditya Care Hospital following a breathing problem. He was three months short of his 100th birthday.

Literary awards
Mahapatra received the Odisha Sahitya Academy Award in 1974 and the Kendra Sahitya Akademi Award in 1987 for his novel Gharadiha.

References

1912 births
2012 deaths
People from Bhadrak
Recipients of the Sahitya Akademi Award in Odia
Recipients of the Atibadi Jagannath Das Award
Recipients of the Odisha Sahitya Akademi Award
State cabinet ministers of Odisha
Poets from Odisha
Odia-language poets
Indian magazine editors
20th-century Indian poets
Indian male poets
20th-century Indian male writers